Major Harris may refer to:
 Major Harris (American football)
 Major Harris (singer)